Lewis Seiler (September 30, 1890 – January 8, 1964) was an American film director. He directed more than 80 films between 1923 and 1958. 

Seiler was born in New York City and died in Hollywood, California.

Partial filmography 

A Bankrupt Honeymoon (1926)
The Great K & A Train Robbery (1926)
No Man's Gold (1926)
Wolf Fangs (1927)
The Ghost Talks (1929)
Girls Gone Wild (1929)
Frontier Marshal (1934)
Charlie Chan in Paris (1935)
He Couldn't Say No (1938)
Crime School (1938)
Heart of the North (1938)
You Can't Get Away with Murder (1939)
Hell's Kitchen (1939)
Dust Be My Destiny (1939)
King of the Underworld (1939)
Tugboat Annie Sails Again (1940)
Flight Angels (1940)
It All Came True (1940)
The Big Shot (1942)
Beyond the Line of Duty (1942)
Pittsburgh (1942)
Guadalcanal Diary (1943)
Something for the Boys (1944)
Whiplash (1948)
The Winning Team (1952)
The System (1953)
Women's Prison (1955)
Battle Stations (1956)
Over-Exposed (1956)
The True Story of Lynn Stuart (1958)

References

External links 

1890 births
1964 deaths
American film directors